Underbelly: Vanishing Act is a television miniseries based on the story of Melissa Caddick's disappearance. It first aired on the Nine Network in April 2022. The two-part miniseries is the seventh season of the true crime anthology series Underbelly.

Premise
Underbelly: Vanishing Act is based on the story of high-roller Melissa Caddick who was alleged to have embezzled $40 million before vanishing from in November 2020 the day after the Australian Securities & Investments Commission executed a search warrant on her Dover Heights, Sydney home.

Production
The series was first announced by the Nine Network in September 2021. It was produced by Screentime.

Cast
Kate Atkinson as Melissa Caddick
Colin Friels as George K
Jerome Velinsky as Anthony Koletti
Tai Hara as Vincent Lee
Maya Stange as Angie Beyersdorf
Dylan Hare as Nash Malouf
Ursula Mills as Phoebe Quinn
Frankie J Holden as Ted Grimley
Anne Tenney as Barbara Grimley
Sophie Bloom as Wendy

Viewership

References

Nine Network original programming
Television shows set in Sydney
2020s Australian crime television series
2020s Australian drama television series
2020s Australian television miniseries
2022 Australian television series debuts
2022 Australian television series endings